The Roman Catholic Diocese of Vijayawada is a diocese located in the city of Vijayawada in the Ecclesiastical province of Visakhapatnam in India. Administratively, the diocese encompasses the geographical Krishna district of the state of Andhra Pradesh . The Diocese of Vijayawada has the largest catholic population(.35 million) among all the Suffragan dioceses of the Archdiocese of Visakhapatnam.

History
 10 January 1933: Established as Mission “sui iuris” of Bezwada from the Diocese of Hyderabad
 13 April 1937: Promoted as Diocese of Bezwada
 21 October 1950: Renamed as Diocese of Vijayawada

Diocesan demographics
As of 2017 the Catholic population of the diocese was 3,50,000.  These Catholics were served by 189 diocesan priests and 32 priests of religious orders in 98 parishes.  Also laboring in the diocese were 37 religious brothers, and 795 nuns

Leadership

 Bishop Thelagathoti J. Raja Rao, S.M.M. (2 February 2016 – Present)
 Bishop Prakash Mallavarapu (26 July 2002 – 3 July 2012); named Metropolitan Archbishop of Visakhapatnam
 Bishop Marampudi Joji (Later Archbishop) (8 November 1996 – 29 January 2000)
 Bishop Joseph S. Thumma (23 January 1971 – 8 November 1996)
 Bishop Ambrose De Battista, P.I.M.E. (13 December 1951 – 23 January 1971)

Parishes

Shrines
 Gunadalamatha-Shrine
 Br Joseph Thamby Shrine Avutapally
 Lourdu Matha Shrine, Vennanapudi

Seminaries
 St. Ambrose Minor Seminary, Nuzivid(1957)
 Angel Minor Seminary, Nuzivid
 St.Paul's Regional Seminary(1984)
 St.Joseph's Major Seminary, Chinavutapalli (2000)

Education
As of 2019, the diocese has 27 Elementary schools, 9 Upper primary Schools, 50 High Schools, 3 Higher Secondary Schools, 10 Colleges, 2 Nursing training Institutes, 10 Non-Formal training centers, 16 Parish Elementary Schools departing education from pre-kindergarten through Post Graduation.

Catholic Institutions of Repute :

 Andhra Loyola college
 Maris Stella College
 NSM Public School
 Nirmala High School
 VSt.Johns, Gannavaram
 Atkinsons High
 St.Mary's English Medium School, Kankipadu

Media & Publications

 RADIO MARIA, Vijayawada.
 DIVYAVANI TV Zonal Productions, Vijayawada.
 IN VINCULO CHRISTI (Published since 1957)

Saints and causes for canonisation
 Servant of God Joseph Thamby, OFS

References

External links
 Official Website
 Official YouTube Channel
 Gunadala Matha Shrine
 Divyavani TV
 CBCI
 CCBI
 Vailankanni Shrine
 GCatholic.org
 Catholic Hierarchy
 UCAN
 The Vatican

Roman Catholic dioceses in India
Christian organizations established in 1933
Roman Catholic dioceses and prelatures established in the 20th century
Christianity in Andhra Pradesh
1933 establishments in India
Vijayawada